Anzano may refer to:

 Anzano del Parco, a comune in Lombardy, Italy
 Anzano di Puglia, a comune in Apulia, Italy